Lynda Page (born c. 1950) is a saga author based in the Lincolnshire village of Epworth, England, where she lives on a daughter's holiday park. She has written over 20 critically praised saga novels, which reached the bestseller charts of WH Smiths and The Sunday Times.

Early work
Born and raised in Leicester, she left home at 17. Page began writing her first novel, Annie, in 1987, during lunch hours while working in various jobs, among them as a secretary with Land Rover Parts in Desford. Annie was sent by a friend to the literary agent Darley Anderson, who arranged for her to sign a contract with her current publishers, Headline. Her debut novel, Evie, was released in 1992, followed by Annie. Her next two books had the main character as the title; later her titles were popular sayings.

Style
Page's novels are predominantly set in Leicester and are renowned for strong plots and characters. Her books make use of Leicestershire speech and often involve a sense of intrigue or crime. Initially, her time settings ranged from the turn of the 20th century (At the Toss of a Sixpence) to the 1970s (Josie). In the 2000s, she found a niche writing sagas set in the 1950s and 1960s. Some of her recent books feature the fictitious holiday camp Jolly's in the 1960s.

Books

References

External links

The author's personal blog

20th-century English novelists
21st-century English novelists
Living people
People from Leicester
Year of birth missing (living people)